Ernest Lee Wilford, Jr. (born January 14, 1979) is a former American football wide receiver. He was drafted by the Jacksonville Jaguars in the fourth round of the 2004 NFL Draft. He played college football at Virginia Tech. He is currently a sheriffs deputy with the Jacksonville Sheriff's Office.

Wilford has also played for the Miami Dolphins.

Early years
Wilford graduated from Fork Union Military Academy and played football for Armstrong High School in Richmond. He participated in Indoor and Outdoor track, also in Varsity football.

College career
Wilford played college football at  Virginia Tech. Wilford graduated as the Hokies' career leader in receptions. He held the team records for most passes caught in a season, most receiving yards in a game, and most touchdown receptions in a game. However, Wilford is probably most remembered for dropping a 2 point conversion pass that would have tied the game with about 6 minutes left against #1 Miami in 2001.

Pre-draft
Wilford attended the NFL Combine.

He measured in at 6'4" 226 pounds. He ran a 4.81 40 yard dash (1.68 10 yard split), a 4.17 20 yard shuttle, and had a vertical jump of 40.5". He also broad jumped 10'10". At his Pro Day, he improved his 40-yard dash to a 4.76.

Professional career

First stint with Jaguars
Wilford was drafted by the Jacksonville Jaguars in the 4th round of the 2004 NFL Draft.

Miami Dolphins
Wilford signed with the Miami Dolphins on February 29, 2008. The deal was worth $13 million over four years, and included a $6 million signing bonus. He appeared in seven games for the Dolphins in 2008 (starting none) and caught just three passes for 25 yards.

The Dolphins converted Wilford to tight end during the 2009 offseason, but released him prior to the regular season on August 24.

Second stint with Jaguars
Wilford re-signed with the Jacksonville Jaguars on August 25, 2009. On May 21, 2010, he cut his hair which had been growing for over six years in recognition of Jacksonville's Wolfson Children's Hospital cancer unit, as a donation.

Wilford was released on September 4, 2010. On Thursday September 16, 2010, the Jaguars re-signed Wilford back to the 53 man roster stating that he provides a  veteran who is familiar with the system and can contribute on special teams. Also his salary is not guaranteed, making Wilford a low-risk investment. To make room for him on the roster, the team has released wide out John Matthews.  Wilford also played tight end in addition to wide receiver.

Incident at Jacksonville Beach club
Early in the morning on January 14, 2011, Wilford was arrested for inappropriately touching a female bartender at the Ritz Club in Jacksonville Beach.  When confronted by Jacksonville Beach Police and asked to leave, Wilford struggled with police and was eventually tasered twice and arrested.  He was released on $5,000 bond later that day and charged with resisting arrest and trespassing. He later pleaded no contest to this charge.

Jacksonville Sheriff's Office
In 2015, Ernest Wilford joined the Jacksonville Sheriff's Office as a police officer.

References

External links
 Jacksonville Jaguars bio
 Miami Dolphins bio
 

1979 births
Living people
Players of American football from Richmond, Virginia
American football wide receivers
American football tight ends
Virginia Tech Hokies football players
Jacksonville Jaguars players
Miami Dolphins players